Strawberry River may refer to:

 Strawberry River (Arkansas), United States
 Strawberry River (Utah), United States